The bidding process for the 2026 AFC Women's Asian Cup will be the process by which the location for the 20th AFC Women's Asian Cup will be selected.

Hosting requirements
The following four football associations submitted their interest to host the tournament by the 31 July 2022 deadline. The host country will be announced in 2023.

The tournament is expected to continue the format of the 2022 AFC Women's Asian Cup edition, with a total of 27 matches taking place, with 12 teams competing in the tournament.

Bids
Four countries have expressed interests in hosting the tournament:

Confirmed bid

Saudi Arabia
Saudi Arabian Football Federation officially submitted its interests in hosting the competition. Unlike the three other bidders, Saudi Arabia's bid was seen as a surprise, with its women's team just only being recently created, as well as the country having never even competed in a regular competitive Women's Asian Cup qualification. Though never hosting any previous women's competition, Saudi Arabia hosted the FIFA Confederations Cup from 1992 to 1997, as well as the 1989 FIFA World Youth Championship. On 2 December 2022, the Saudi delegation submitted its bid to host the 2026 edition.

Saudi Arabia's bid is also the most controversial, due to ongoing controversies surrounding women's rights in the country; there have been accusations of Saudis using the bid in an attempt to whitewash the country's image.

Confirmed interests

Australia
Football Australia officially submitted the bid to host the 2026 AFC Women's Asian Cup. Australia has previously hosted the 2006 AFC Women's Asian Cup, which was the first major Asian tournament staged in the country following its ascension to the AFC. Australia will also co-host the 2023 FIFA Women's World Cup with New Zealand, the first major Women's World Cup to be staged in two countries. Outside two major tournaments, Australia also hosted the 1981 and 1993 U-20 World Cups, as well as the 2015 AFC Asian Cup. The venues are to be declared later.

Jordan
Jordan Football Association announced it had submitted the bid to host the competition. Jordan has recently hosted the 2018 AFC Women's Asian Cup, which was the first Women's Asian Cup staged in West Asia. Jordan also hosted the 2016 FIFA U-17 Women's World Cup, which was also the first in a West Asian and Arab country.

Uzbekistan
Uzbekistan Football Association officially announced its submission to bid the tournament. Uzbekistan has never hosted any major senior tournament in either gender, but it has hosted various Asian youth tournaments, notably the 2008 and 2010 AFC U-16 Championships, the 2022 AFC U-23 Asian Cup and the upcoming 2023 AFC U-20 Asian Cup.

References

2026